Christian Le Squer (born 30 September 1962) is a French three-star Michelin chef at Restaurant Le Cinq, Paris.

Early life and education 
Le Squer was born in Plouhinec in the department of Finistere in Brittany. He first wanted to become a sailor and embarked at the age of 14 on his uncle's fishing trawler for two weeks where a sailor introduced him to cooking. He then hesitated between cooking and pastry, but a baking internship made him decide on a culinary career.

He joined a hotel school and graduated in 1986 with a Certificat d'Aptitude Professionnelle) and a Brevet d'Études Professionnelles) in cooking at a professional high school in Vannes.

Professional career 
After a training course in several prestigious restaurants located in Paris such as Le Divellec, Lucas Carton, Taillevent and Le Ritz, he became the chef of the Café de la Paix Restaurant Opéra, where he obtained in 1996 his first Michelin star and the second one in 1998.

In 1999, succeeding to Ghislaine Arabian, he became the chef of the Pavillon Ledoyen located at the avenue des Champs-Élysées in the 8th arrondissement of Paris. In 2000, he received two Michelin stars in this establishment, and obtained in 2002 his third star at the Guide Michelin. In 2008, he founded a new restaurant in Paris, the Etc. (Épicure traditionnelle cuisine), where he received one Michelin star the following year. In 2011, he founded the restaurant La Grande Verrière at the Jardin d'Acclimatation next to the Bois de Boulogne. In 2013, he was awarded with "five toques" by the Gault et Millau for the Restaurant Ledoyen.

Since 2014, he has held the position of head chef at restaurant Le Cinq at the Four Seasons Hotel George V in Paris, where he received two Michelin stars in 2015 and three in 2016.

Signature dishes 

 
 Turbot flesh with truffled emulsion of Ratte potatoes
 Small sole fillets with vin jaune
 Big crunchy scampis with citrus emulsion
 Chantilly of oysters

See also 
List of chefs
List of Michelin starred restaurants

References

External links 
Official site of the Restaurant Ledoyen
Official site of La Grande Verrière

1962 births
French chefs
French people of Breton descent
People from Morbihan
Living people
Head chefs of Michelin starred restaurants